Danielle Ashley Zavala (born 16 April 1990), known as Dani Zavala, is an American-born Guamanian former footballer who played as a defender. She has been a member of the Guam women's national team.

Early life
Zavala was raised in El Camino Village, California.

References

1990 births
Living people
Women's association football defenders
Guamanian women's footballers
Guam women's international footballers
American women's soccer players
Soccer players from California
Sportspeople from Santa Clara, California
Sportspeople from Los Angeles County, California
Penn State Nittany Lions women's soccer players